National Route 403 (N403) forms part of the Philippine highway network. It runs through central Cavite. It connects the city of Trece Martires to the municipality of Naic.

Route description 

The segment of Governor's Drive from its intersection with N64 (Tanza–Trece Martires Road) and N404 (Trece Martires–Indang Road) in the city proper of Trece Martires to its intersection with Antero Soriano Highway and Sabang Road in the town proper of Naic. It also passes through the municipality of Tanza in between.

This route is also known as Trece Martires–Naic Road and Dasmariñas–Trece Martires City–Naic Road.

Intersections

References

External links 
 Department of Public Works and Highways

Roads in Cavite